Lulham may refer to:
Lulham, Herefordshire, England
Lulham, Iran, a village in West Azerbaijan Province, Iran
Lulham (surname)